Gustavo Raul "Gus" Sorola III (born February 22, 1978) is an American actor and podcast host. He is best known for his work with Rooster Teeth.

Early life 
Sorola was born in Austin, and raised in Eagle Pass, Texas, near the Mexico–United States border. After choosing to drop out from Rice University, he started working at a tech support company, teleNetwork, where he met Rooster Teeth co-founders Burnie Burns and Geoff Ramsey.

Career 
Sorola is a founding member of Rooster Teeth Productions. He is still currently employed at the company and appears in many of their productions. Since 2003, he has voiced the character of Richard Simmons in the machinima series Red vs. Blue. He was also a voice actor in The Strangerhood from 2004 to 2006. His live-action credits include Rooster Teeth Shorts, which started in 2009, and Immersion, which started in 2010. He also starred in three RT Docs: Unconventional, Why We're Here, and Common Ground.

Sorola has also managed and hosted the Rooster Teeth Podcast (formerly known as the Drunk Tank) since 2008. On the podcast, Sorola shares many anecdotes about his life, including his childhood and early career. He was also part of several other podcasts such as The Patch, Let Me Clarify, and Heroes & Halfwits. Since March 2020 he has co-hosted the award-winning podcast Black Box Down. Sorola was nominated for Host of the Year at the 2022 Quill Podcast Awards for his work on Black Box Down. In May 2022 he began co-hosting the ANMA podcast.

Personal life 
Married to Esther Sorola, they live in Austin, Texas with their dog, Oswald. Their previous dog, Benjamin, died on May 3, 2021. He is an ordained minister of the Universal Life Church and has performed several marriages for his friends and colleagues. A pragmatic, straightforward person, Sorola describes himself as asocial and tries to avoid interactions with others.

A self-proclaimed fan of Bungie "since Minotaur: The Labyrinths of Crete", Sorola was instrumental in making Rooster Teeth fans of Halo, the series in which Red vs. Blue is made, as when he, Burns, Ramsey and Matt Hullum visited E3 2001, Sorola made them visit the Bungie booth, featuring a Halo: Combat Evolved demo.

Filmography

Film

Television

Web

Video games

References

External links 

 
 

1978 births
Living people
American male voice actors
American male web series actors
21st-century American male actors
American male actors of Mexican descent
Male actors from Austin, Texas
Rice University alumni
Rooster Teeth people
People from Eagle Pass, Texas
Screenwriters from Texas
21st-century American screenwriters